= Modem tax =

Hoax

The modem tax is a hoax dating back to the days of bulletin board systems stating the Federal Communications Commission or the United States Congress intends to impose a tax on modem use. The FCC has described it as an urban myth.
